Eidsvik is a village in Ålesund Municipality in Møre og Romsdal county, Norway. Since 2002, Eidsvik has been considered a part of the Vatne urban area, so its population is no longer separately tracked.

References

Villages in Møre og Romsdal
Ålesund